Dhuleshwar Meena was an Indian politician. He was a Member of Parliament, representing Rajasthan in the Rajya Sabha the upper house of India's Parliament as a member of the Indian National Congress.

References

External links
Official biographical sketch in Parliament of India website

Meena people
Rajya Sabha members from Rajasthan
Indian National Congress politicians
Lok Sabha members from Rajasthan
1935 births
Living people
India MPs 1962–1967